Mildred Fay Jefferson (April 6, 1927 – October 15, 2010) was an American physician and anti-abortion political activist. The first black woman to graduate from Harvard Medical School, the first woman to graduate in surgery from Harvard Medical School and the first woman to become a member of the Boston Surgical Society, she is known for her opposition to the legalization of abortion and her work as president of the National Right to Life Committee.

Personal life and education
Born in Pittsburg, Texas, Jefferson was the only child of Millard and Guthrie Jefferson, a Methodist minister, and a school teacher. Her parents divorced before 1976 and lived in Roxbury after their divorce. Jefferson was raised in Carthage, Texas, in the Wesley-Calvinist tradition. At a young age, "Millie" followed the town doctor around on his horse drawn buggy while he made housecalls, this would later inspire her to become a doctor.

She earned her bachelor's degree in three years from Texas College. Since she was considered too young to attend medical school, she went to Tufts University where she received her master's degree in biology. She then went on to Harvard Medical School and graduated in 1951, becoming the first black woman to do so.

Jefferson married in 1963 to Shane Cunningham, whom she met on a skiing trip, a real estate manager. As of 1976, the couple lived in Back Bay and had no children.

Career
Jefferson achieved board certification in surgery in 1972. After graduating from medical school, she did a surgical internship at Boston City Hospital, becoming the first woman to do so. She was also the first female doctor at the former Boston University Medical Center. By 1984, Jefferson was a general surgeon at the center and a professor of surgery at the Boston University School of Medicine. She would later become the first woman to become a member of the Boston Surgical Society.

Anti-abortion work

One root of Jefferson's opposition to abortion was her dedication to the Hippocratic oath, which morally bound her to the preservation of life. Her interest in abortion issues was triggered when she was asked to sign a petition opposing a resolution proposed by the American Medical Association supporting liberalization of abortion-related laws.

It was around 1970 when Jefferson became one of the founders of Massachusetts Citizens for Life. She later helped found the National Right to Life Committee (NRLC). In 1971, she became a member of the NRLC board of directors. She became the vice president of the National Right to Life Committee in 1973 and then was elected as chairman of the board the following year. Mildred then was elected as president of NRLC, serving three terms from 1975 to 1978. Jefferson concurrently wrote a column, "Lifelines", in the National Right to Life News publication.

In 1975, Jefferson was the first witness for the prosecution in the manslaughter case levied against Kenneth Edelin for his performance of a legal abortion.

It was in 1980 that Jefferson helped the National Right to Life Committee start a political action committee because she believed it was important to lobby and support anti-abortion candidates for office. While a Republican, she helped Democrat Ellen McCormack run for the Democratic Party presidential nomination in 1976. Apart from NRLC, Jefferson served on boards of directors of more than 30 anti-abortion organizations.

Jefferson is also noted for changing Ronald Reagan's stance on abortion from pro-choice to anti-abortion. He wrote to her in a letter, "You have made it irrefutably clear that an abortion is the taking of a human life, I am grateful to you."

Political activities and positions
Jefferson supported the one issue, anti-abortion 1975–6 campaign of Ellen McCormack for president and appeared in television advertisements for McCormack.

Jefferson was a self-described "Lincoln Republican" and served on the 1980 Massachusetts Reagan for President Campaign. Jefferson had first met Reagan in 1973 while he was governor of California. She also unsuccessfully sought the Republican nomination for the 1982, 1990, and 1994 U.S. Senate elections.

Jefferson opposed the Equal Rights Amendment on the basis that it is unnecessary as the Constitution has no in-built inequity. She for years called for a constitutional amendment to reverse the 1973 Supreme Court decision in Roe v. Wade, rejecting the notion that abortion is a private matter between a woman and her physician. Jefferson also expressed opposition to welfare and busing, and support for the death penalty.

Death
Jefferson died in her Cambridge home on October 15, 2010, at the age of 83 years. She was divorced and had no children. She was buried in her hometown of Carthage, Texas.

See also
 Black conservatism in the United States
 List of African-American Republicans

References

External links

 National Right to Life Committee website
 Harvard University page
 Papers of Mildred Jefferson, 1947-2010. Schlesinger Library, Radcliffe Institute, Harvard University.
 Mildred Jefferson speaks on abortion
 

1927 births
2010 deaths
African-American activists
African-American physicians
American surgeons
Methodists from Texas
American anti-abortion activists
Harvard Medical School alumni
Massachusetts Republicans
People from Cambridge, Massachusetts
People from Carthage, Texas
Texas College alumni
Tufts University School of Medicine alumni
People from Pittsburg, Texas
African-American people in Massachusetts politics
African-American women in politics
20th-century American physicians
20th-century American women physicians
Women surgeons
Candidates in the 1982 United States elections
Candidates in the 1990 United States elections
Candidates in the 1994 United States elections
Methodists from Massachusetts
Black conservatism in the United States